The  were presented every year by the  (JAFA) from 1982 to 2011. They honor the best in adventure fiction published in the previous year.

The Japan Adventure Fiction Association was founded in 1981 by Chin Naitō (1936–2011) and was disbanded in 2012 after his death.

Winners

See also
 Mystery Writers of Japan Award
 Japanese detective fiction

References

External links 
 The official website of the Japan Adventure Fiction Association 
 List of winners  
 J'Lit | Awards : Japan Adventure Fiction Association Prize | Books from Japan 

Mystery and detective fiction awards
Japanese literary awards
Awards established in 1982
1982 establishments in Japan
Adventure fiction
Awards disestablished in 2011
2011 disestablishments in Japan